Charles Herbert Jenner (1809–1891) was an English Anglican cleric and a cricketer with amateur status.

Life 
Charles Jenner was born on 26 July 1809 in Westminster, London. He was the third son of Dr Herbert Jenner, and brother of Herbert Jenner and Henry Lascelles Jenner. He was educated at Eton College and Trinity Hall, Cambridge.

As a cricketer, Jenner was associated with Cambridge University and made his first-class debut in 1828. He was ordained deacon in 1832, priest in 1833, and became rector of Merthyr Dyfan in 1834. He moved to become rector of Wenvoe in 1867. He died on 6 October 1891 in Wallington, Surrey.

References

Bibliography
 

1809 births
1891 deaths
19th-century English Anglican priests
English cricketers
English cricketers of 1826 to 1863
Cambridge University cricketers
People educated at Eton College
Alumni of Trinity Hall, Cambridge
Gentlemen of Kent cricketers